Variecolol is an immunosuppressant/antiviral compound isolated from ascomycete.

References

Antiviral drugs
Immunosuppressants
Oxygen heterocycles
Heterocyclic compounds with 5 rings
Alkene derivatives